The "Shalka" Doctor is the common fan name given to the character that appeared as an alternative ninth incarnation of the Doctor in the flash-animated serial Scream of the Shalka in 2003 and the later short story The Feast of the Stone which were based on the British science fiction television series, Doctor Who. He was voiced by the actor Richard E. Grant.

Overview
Scream of the Shalka was designed to be an official continuation of Doctor Who. At the time, there were no plans for a continuation of the television series and plans for another film were progressing very slowly. The Shalka Doctor was intended to be the ninth incarnation, as two lines in Scream of the Shalka imply: the Doctor mentions that Andy Warhol once wanted to paint "all nine" of him, and comments that a dead cat has used up its nine lives, like he has. The Shalka Doctor's claim to being the "Ninth Doctor" was also backed up by BBC press releases.

However, the 2005 series was announced in September 2003—about two months before the webcast could meet its 13 November release date. This led to immediate controversy about the "official" status of the animated Ninth Doctor. Martin Trickey, executive producer of The Scream of the Shalka, noted these concerns when he was interviewed at the time of Shalka'''s release: "The BBC said it was the ninth Doctor, so that's great. Is it part of the canon? I don't know. There's a big argument raging on the message board. I just hope people enjoy it. That's the main thing. Whether people choose to see it as the official Ninth Doctor or not is really up to them."

As of 2005, Christopher Eccleston was established as the definitive Ninth Doctor, with BBC press releases, advertisements, and episode material have firmly established Eccleston as "the Ninth Doctor".

To date the Shalka Doctor has appeared in five officially licensed Doctor Who'' products: the original webcast, the novelisation of the webcast by Paul Cornell which was released by BBC Books and its audiobook, the DVD release of the webcast and the short story "The Feast of the Stone" by Cavan Scott and Mark Wright which has to date only been published on the BBC's "Cult Vampire Magazine" webpage.

A further series was commissioned by the BBC. It was called "Blood of the Robots" and was being written by Simon Clark. Three episodes had been written before it was cancelled because of the imminent return of the live series.

Appearance and characterisation

The Doctor is visually modelled on Grant himself. Grant has described his interpretation of the Doctor as "Sherlock Holmes in space." The Shalka Doctor has an aristocratic bearing. He is resentful of an unseen power directing his travels. He refuses, at first, to intervene in the Shalka invasion of the village of Lannet until the death of a homeless woman raises his ire, and is abrasive with the military characters who ally with him in the Shalka story. He seems haunted by some undisclosed past event, to the point where he actively opposes the notion of Alison becoming a companion. The android which contains the consciousness of the Master (voiced by Derek Jacobi) hints that the Doctor's previous companion may have met an untimely end.

External links

Scream of the Shalka

 Scream of the Shalka, on the BBC website
 Scream of the Shalka at The Doctor Who Reference Guide
 Scream of the Shalka theme music  mp3 file

"The Feast of the Stone"
 The Feast of the Stone, on the BBC website
Feast of the Stone at The Doctor Who Reference Guide

References

Television characters introduced in 2003
Doctor Who Doctors
Male characters in animation